Marina Blumenthal was born in Buenos Aires, Argentina, and, as a young girl, began a profession in acting and modelling. Her roles in Argentina covered: film, television, commercials and stage (winning the A.C.E. award for best actress in a play). Blumenthal has studied theatre, music, dancing, and improvisation.

After being cast in a Latino Sitcom,  Blumenthal moved to Los Angeles, where she has had roles in films, and television, as well as modelling, and hosting. Her filmography includes "Cuando Volveras", "Easter Bunny, Kill! Kill!", and the TV movie "Bike Cops Van Nuys". As well as appearing in Telemundo TV series, Blumenthal co-hosts the "Repo Radio Show" with Lou Pizarro, and also features in the  web comedy series  "Chamacas", on Sofia Vergara's YouTube Channel. The actress has a number of forthcoming film and television projects.

Filmography 
1999: El mar de Lucas
2003: The Ghouls
2003: My First Time (1 episode)
2004: Como TV's (TV-Serie)
2004: Porno
2006: Easter Bunny, Kill! Kill!
2008: Cuando volveras
2008: The Junkyard Willie Movie: Lost in Transit (Video)
2013: Chamacas (TV-Serie)
2013: Bike Cops Van Nuys (TV-Movie)
2015: Flowers for Monica (Short film)
2016: The Potential for Beauty
2017: Ataka (Short Film)
2017: The Heart of a Woman (Short Film)
2019: The Power of Beauty

References

External Links

Year of birth missing (living people)
Living people
Argentine film actresses
Argentine television actresses
Argentine female models
Actresses from Buenos Aires
21st-century Argentine women